Big Anne Creek is a  long third-order tributary to the Niobrara River in Keya Paha County, Nebraska.  This is the only stream of this name in the United States.

Variant names
According to the Geographic Names Information System, it has also been known historically as:
Anne Creek

Watershed

See also

List of rivers of Nebraska

References

Rivers of Keya Paha County, Nebraska
Rivers of Nebraska